Norge Train Depot is a historic home located at Norge, near Williamsburg, James City County, Virginia. It was built about 1907 by the Chesapeake and Ohio Railway from standardized plans. The train station is the last surviving example of a wood frame "informal standard" depot in the six states that were served by Chesapeake and Ohio Railway. Originals were built according to an informal plan and no standard drawings were prepared or entered in the railway's set of design standards.

It is a simple one-story wood balloon frame building, twelve bays wide on the south side, seven bays wide on the north end, and one bay deep. The building is sheathed in panels of German weatherboard and features a low hipped roof with overhanging and slightly flared eaves and boxed cornice covered with beaded board siding.  In February 2006, the station was relocated about 1 mile to a site adjacent to the James City County Branch of the Williamsburg Regional Library (opened in 1996) on Croaker Road. It was renovated as a museum and a community center in 2012.

It was listed on the National Register of Historic Places in 2009.

In December 2015 the Norge Depot Association brought in a red Georgia Railroad caboose donated by the Cumberland Hospital for Children and Adolescents in New Kent County. A restoration of the caboose is planned.

Gallery

References

Railway stations on the National Register of Historic Places in Virginia
Stations along Chesapeake and Ohio Railway lines
Buildings and structures in James City County, Virginia
National Register of Historic Places in James City County, Virginia
Railway stations in the United States opened in 1907